Six ships of the French Navy have been named Forbin in honour of the 17th century admiral Claude Forbin-Gardanne:

 A first-class propeller aviso (1859–1884) 
 , a second-class cruiser (1885–1921) 
 An auxiliary patrol boat of the Free French Forces (1944). Originally a cargo ship, she was captured by the British in Gibraltar and requisitioned. She was eventually scuttled in Arromanches to be used as an artificial harbour on the 9 June 1944, in the context of the Invasion of Normandy.
 , a  commissioned in 2008

French Navy ship names